Jean-Luc Antoine Pierre Mélenchon (born 19 August 1951) is a French politician who was a member of the National Assembly for the 4th constituency of Bouches-du-Rhône from 2017 to 2022. He led the La France Insoumise group in the National Assembly from 2017 to 2021. Mélenchon has run three times in elections for president of France; in 2012 and 2017, and a strong third in the 2022 election, where he narrowly missed continuing on to the second round in France's two-round voting system.

After joining the Socialist Party in 1976, he was successively elected a municipal councillor of Massy (1983) and general councillor of Essonne (1985). In 1986, he entered the Senate, to which he was reelected in 1995 and 2004. He also served as Minister for Vocational Education between 2000 and 2002, under Minister of National Education Jack Lang, in the cohabitation government of Lionel Jospin. He was part of the radical-left wing of the Socialist Party until the Reims Congress of November 2008, when he left the party to found the Left Party with Marc Dolez, a member of the National Assembly. Mélenchon first served as party president before becoming party co-president alongside Martine Billard, a position he held until 2014. As co-president of the Left Party, he joined the electoral coalition of the Left Front before the 2009 European Parliament election; he was elected as a Member of the European Parliament (MEP) in the South-West France constituency and reelected in 2014. He became the Left Front's candidate in the 2012 presidential election, in which he came in fourth, receiving 11.1% of the first-round vote.

Mélenchon founded the party  (LFI, "France Unbowed") in February 2016. He stood as a candidate in the 2017 presidential election "outside the frame of political parties", again coming in fourth, with 19.6% of the first-round vote. He became a member of the National Assembly for  following the 2017 legislative election, receiving 59.9% in the second round in Bouches-du-Rhône's 4th constituency, located in Marseille (France's second-largest city). Mélenchon stood again under the LFI banner in the 2022 presidential election, coming in third with 21.95% of the vote, just over one point short of qualifying for the second round. After this, he led the newly-formed New Ecological and Social People's Union (NUPES) alliance of parties to a second-place performance in the 2022 French legislative election.

Biography

Early life (1951–1976) 
Jean-Luc Mélenchon was born in Tangier (Tangier International Zone), Morocco. 
His father, Georges, was a postmaster of Spanish descent, and his mother, Jeanine Bayona, was a primary school teacher of Spanish and Sicilian descent. He grew up in Morocco, until his family moved to France in 1962.

Mélenchon was then educated at the Lycée Pierre-Corneille, a state secondary school in Rouen, Normandy. With a degree in philosophy from the University of Franche-Comté in Besançon and having gained the CAPES (a professional teaching qualification), he became a teacher before entering politics.

Socialist Mitterrandist leader (1976–1986) 
Jean-Luc Mélenchon left Besançon to enter professional life in Lons-le-Saunier (Jura), and joined the Socialist Party (PS) in September 1976. He soon assumed local and departmental responsibilities (deputy section secretary of Montaigu), and developed a federal newspaper that fought for a union between PS and the French Communist Party (PCF). It was at this time that the latter broke the agreements of the union of the left on a joint program of government. He then came to the attention of Claude Germon, mayor of Massy (Essonne) and member of the executive office of the PS responsible for the business section. Without stable work after his application was rejected at the Croix du Jura newspaper, he was hired by Claude Germon to become his private secretary.

He became one of the leading Mitterrandist leaders of the Essonne federation, which led him to the position of first secretary of this federation at the Valence Congress in 1981; he remained in this position until 1986. He positioned himself both against the "Second left" of Michel Rocard and the "Centre of socialist studies, research, and education" (CERES) of Jean-Pierre Chevènement.

He was elected senator during the senatorials of 1986.

Socialist Party (1986–2008)

Departure from the Socialists and foundation of the Left Party (2008–2012) 
At the Reims Congress, in September 2008, the political current "Trait d'union", created after the victory of the "No" in the French European Constitution referendum of 2005, Mélenchon made a new contribution. On the eve of the filing of the motions, an agreement was reached between the seven contributions of the left wing of the PS, and Jean-Luc Mélenchon was one of the signatories of Motion C entitled "A world ahead", led by Benoît Hamon. He described this gathering as a "historic event": For the first time, this motion brought together all the sensibilities of the left wing of the PS, with emblematic personalities like Gérard Filoche, Marie-Noëlle Lienemann, and Paul Quilès.

On 6 November 2008, the Socialist militants voted to decide between 6 motions. The motion supported by Ségolène Royal led with about 29% of the votes cast, while the one led by Benoît Hamon came in fourth with 18.5%. For Jean-Luc Mélenchon, it is a victory of the outgoing majority, which carries 80% of the votes (with the three firsts motions) and, among them, the motion advocating the alliance in the center. Believing themselves too far from this trend to the point that it would not be useful to take part in the congress, Jean-Luc Mélenchon and Marc Dolez announced on 7 November their decision, "out of fidelity to their commitments", and for their independence of action, to leave the Socialist Party, and to create a new movement "without concession facing the right".

They announced "the construction of a new left-wing party", simply called the "Left Party" (on the German model of Die Linke), and called for "the constitution of a left-wing front for the European elections". On 18 November, in a meeting with the French Communist Party, the two parties announced their alliance in the form of a "partnership", within the framework of a "left front for another democratic and social Europe, against the ratification of the Treaty of Lisbon and the current European Treaties". The launch meeting of the Left Party was held on 29 November in Saint-Ouen, in the presence of Die Linke's co-chairman, Oskar Lafontaine.

First presidential candidacy (2012) 

Mélenchon was the candidate representing the Left Front (Communist Party of France, Left Party, Unitary Left) in the 2012 French presidential election. He took fourth place and achieved 11.10% of the vote, trailing behind François Hollande, Nicolas Sarkozy, and Marine Le Pen (and their respective parties, the Socialist Party, Union for a Popular Movement, and National Front). In comparison, the winner, François Hollande, received 28.63% of the vote.

Presidency of François Hollande (2012–2017) 

Mélenchon represented the Left Front in the Pas-de-Calais' 11th constituency against his rival Marine Le Pen, where she had over 31% in the presidential election. He received third place with 21.46% of the vote, narrowly edged out for second by Socialist Party member Phillip Kemel. Mélenchon decided not to stand in the second round of the election after this result.

During the presidency of François Hollande, Mélenchon became one of the most critical voices in the left against his centrist free-market policy. He denounced a betrayal to the culture and ideas of the French Left.

Second presidential candidacy (2017) 

On 10 February 2016, Melenchon launched the left-wing political platform La France Insoumise ("Unbowed France") during an interview on the French television channel TF1. La France Insoumise was subsequently endorsed by several parties, such as the Left Party and French Communist Party, in addition to members of the Europe Écologie Les Verts such as Sergio Coronado, an assembly member for the 2nd Overseas Constituency, and the mayor of Grenoble, Éric Piolle.

On 12 January 2017, Mélenchon secured the 500 elected sponsors required to be validated by the Constitutional Council. After Benoît Hamon won the nomination for the Parti Socialiste on a left-wing platform, beating former Prime Minister, Manuel Valls, 58–41, Hamon announced on TF1 on 27 February that he and Melenchon had been in talks to form an alliance, but their stances on the European Union separated them, as Melenchon's platform was to renegotiate EU treaties or hold a referendum. France 24 reported following this that, "Adding their scores would place a candidate in first or second place"

Jean-Luc Mélenchon held at a consistent 12% for most of the campaign, until a late upwards surge which put him just behind third place Francois Fillon at 18%. This late surge is mainly due to Mélenchon's performance within the second presidential debate hosted by BFM TV and CNews, where, according to an Elabe poll, he was found the most convincing candidate by 25%. However, he did not qualify for the second round of voting, winning 19% of the vote in the first round, placing fourth.

After the first round, Mélenchon refused to endorse Macron and told his voters that "no vote should go to the National Front", as he had done in 2002. Following constant criticism for this choice, Mélenchon invited members of La France Insoumise to vote on who he will endorse with the choices being "Vote for Emmanuel Macron", "Blank Vote", or "Abstain", with the result being announced on 2 May. 36.12% submitted a blank vote, 34.83% chose to endorse Macron, and 29.05% abstained.

His campaign positions included the intent to establish a Sixth Republic and preserve the environment. According to the NGOs for the development aid Action Against Hunger, Action santé mondiale, CARE France, and ONE Campaign, Jean-Luc Mélenchon was the candidate in the presidential election who is the most engaged regarding international solidarity. Together with other French intellectuals, he vigorously denounces free trade between France and the United States as an example of global exploitation.

Member of the National Assembly (2017–2022) 

In June 2017, Mélenchon became a member of the National Assembly for La France Insoumise following his win in the legislative election in the 4th constituency of Bouches-du-Rhône, which covers parts of the centre of Marseille. He won 59.9% of the vote in the second round against En Marche! candidate Corrine Versini. He defeated sitting member Patrick Mennucci in the first round, a notable member of the Socialist Party in Marseille.

His election to the National Assembly drew national media attention. During the examination of the 2017 Labour Law bill, he was remarked in the National Assembly for his multiple interventions, defending the Labour Code status quo along with fellow La France Insoumise members, arguing that flexibilisation would be harmful to workers. He drew attention from the media once more when he came in Parliament with a five euros food shopping bag to denounce a student benefits cut planned by the government.

In December 2019, Mélenchon received a suspended prison sentence of three months for rebellion and provocation following an altercation with police officers who had come to serve a warrant at the La France Insoumise headquarters in Paris.

2022 elections 

Mélenchon was a candidate for President in the 2022 French presidential election. He was one of three candidates placed without their consent on the ballot for the 2022 French People's Primary, a non-official vote for a common left-wing candidate; he came third out of seven, behind Christiane Taubira and Yannick Jadot. Taubira withdrew in March, and endorsed Mélenchon. Mélenchon's polling numbers surged in the final weeks of campaigning, putting him within chance of making the second round.

In the first round of voting in France's two round voting system, he came in third place with 22% of the vote, behind president Emmanuel Macron in first place with 28%, and narrowly behind Marine Le Pen's 23% of the vote. Only the top two finishers continue on to the second round, so Mélenchon was eliminated after the results of the first round were certified. Mélenchon advised his voters not to vote for Le Pen in the second round, but did not endorse Macron. His 7.7 million first-round voters became a key demographic for the second round. He was the most popular candidate for voters aged 24–35. He was the most voted candidate in the overseas departments of Martinique, Guadeloupe, French Guiana, Réunion, Saint Pierre and Miquelon and Saint Martin, obtaining majorities in several of these jurisdictions. He was also the most voted candidate in Île-de-France.

Mélenchon did not run for re-election in Bouches-du-Rhône's 4th constituency, instead giving his candidacy to Manuel Bompard. Mélenchon has led the New Ecologic and Social People's Union (NUPES) coalition since May. In the 2022 parliamentary election, NUPES won 131 seats.

Political positions 
Mélenchon is a socialist republican and historical materialist, inspired primarily by Jean Jaurès (the founder of French republican socialism). He is a proponent of increased labour rights and the expansion of French welfare programmes. Mélenchon has also called for the mass redistribution of wealth to rectify existing socioeconomic inequalities. Domestic policies proposed by Mélenchon include a 100% income tax on earnings over €360,000 a year, full state reimbursement for health care costs, a reduction in presidential powers in favour of the legislature, and the easing of immigration laws. Mélenchon supports same-sex marriage and women's right to abortion. He also supports the legalisation of cannabis.

Mélenchon believes in the "créolisation" of French culture and society, a term coined by poet Martinican Édouard Glissant, who defines it as "a blend of cultures that creates something new", that "belongs to none of the cultures that comprise it". During a campaign rally in December 2021, Mélenchon told his supporters: "Whatever one's gender, colour or religion, we are called upon to love one another, and so we pool together our tastes and our cultures. That's créolisation. Créolisation is the future of humanity."

Mélenchon is an outspoken critic of the European Union (EU), which he views as having been corrupted through neoliberalism. During his 2012 campaign, Mélenchon positioned himself against the trend towards economic globalisation, which he denounced as disproportionately profiting the financial industry and "high income earners" at the expense of the poor. He insisted international organisations such as the EU threatened to "strangle the voice of the people". He supports a renegotiation of European treaties.

Mélenchon opposes the North Atlantic Treaty Organization (NATO), which he perceives as an affront to France's national sovereignty. He has repeatedly called for France to withdraw from NATO.

Mélenchon has been labelled a "populist" by numerous diverse people, with the PS senator Luc Carvounas saying he goes to "the summits of demagoguery and populism", and the magazine Slate, stating that Mélenchon's rhetoric is "shocking" and implying his entire political life is based around pleasing the people. He has been compared to Marine Le Pen in terms of debating style; political scientist Dominique Reynié even went as far as to say he "flirts with xenophobia when it helps him".

Mélenchon has himself his vision of populism, which he sees as positive if it comes with a left ideology. He is inspired by the philosopher Chantal Mouffe, who sought to theorise and rehabilitate the term "left populism". This theory argues that neoliberalism and austerity only made the far-right stronger and that the word "people" has to be reintroduced into the political sphere in a civic sense rather than an ethnic way (creating a "right populism" to fight).

Mélenchon has voiced his support for Rattachism. Observers have assessed his political positions as left-wing and far-left. According to sociologist Paolo Gerbaudo, Mélenchon had softened his "revolutionary and radical image" and de facto turned towards reformism. During the 2022 presidential campaign, Mélenchon had shifted towards a more pragmatic approach, and campaigning in favor of bread-and-butter issues.

Sixth Republic and French Constitution 
Mélenchon advocates for the holding of a constitutional convention to create a Sixth Republic. In the 2017 party manifesto titled L'Avenir En Commun, it states in the first chapter: "The new constitution that France needs must be radically different". On 14 September 2014, Mélenchon wrote in Le Monde that "France must protect itself from the powers of finance. They devour the real economy. ... To this end, the definition of the constitutional rights of private ownership of capital should change. ... Again, it is inclusion in the Constitution that will fix this and make it a common rule."

Mélenchon is endorsed by the Movement for the 6th Republic, and has spoken positively of them before. A spokesman for La France Insoumise affirmed that Mélenchon was very welcoming of a Sixth Republic run by the people that welcomes democracy, ecology, and challenges social issues. The constitutional convention members must not have ever been elected representatives, and they would not be able to present themselves thereafter.

Agriculture and animal treatment
The association L214, which is a non-profit for animal protection, stated that he was the only candidate "for animals" during its evaluation of the candidates' programmes, giving him a score of 15.7/20, placing him at the head of 11 candidates.

European Parliament
Mélenchon's attendance before the 2012 presidential election was at 63%, and after this, his average is often compiled with pre-2012, so it is compiled at 71.40%. Mélenchon justified his relatively low attendance with how active he is within France itself, and has posted a list of other reasons on his blog. He increased his attendance after that, with the website votewatch.eu reporting it in 2017 at 85.1%.

Foreign policy

Germany 
Mélenchon is critical of German policies. After writing a pamphlet against German policies in May 2015, Mélenchon declared: "But I'm not being anti-German. My aim is to rid my readers of any fascination with the so-called 'German model'. What a 'model', indeed! It is a mockery, a fake paradise, whose population suffers from increasing impoverishment and social violence. The fantasy of the 'German model' is the opium of the rich!"

After the German Chancellor Angela Merkel, in December 2014, described reform efforts so far in France and Italy as "insufficient", Mélenchon replied through Twitter in German and French: "Maul zu, Frau #Merkel ! Frankreich ist frei. Occupez-vous de vos pauvres et de vos équipements en ruines !" ("Shut your mouth, Mrs. Merkel! France is free. Take care of your poor and your ruined equipment.")

In reaction to the referendum on the Greek sovereign debt crisis in early July 2015, he said that the "right-wing German government" was primarily responsible for the aggravation of the crisis.

Ukraine
Mélenchon supported the 2014 Russian annexation of Crimea, stating that "...Crimean ports [were] vital for Russia's security", and that Russia was taking "...protective measures against an adventurous putschist power", also alleging that Ukraine was influenced by neo-Nazis. He further opposed imposing sanctions on Russia, and as a member of the European Parliament, voted against all forms of cooperation with Ukraine, including on science. In 2015, Melenchon referred to Ukraine as a country "...struggling to be one". During the 2021-2022 Russo-Ukrainian crisis, he said that Russia "...must not cross Ukraine's borders", while stating that the United States should not "...annex Ukraine into NATO".
Melenchon criticized the 2022 Russian invasion of Ukraine, although he blamed the cause of the conflict on what he termed as NATO "pushing ever closer to [Russia's] borders", and opposed delivering arms to Ukraine.

Russia
Some magazine editors claimed Mélenchon "supported Russia" and was sympathetic towards Vladimir Putin. Notably, the journalist Nicolas Hénin said that Mélenchon is "on the left of the political spectrum, but is an advocate for the Kremlin leader", with Hénin quoting how Mélenchon is the "political victim number one" after the murder of the Russian opposition leader Boris Nemtsov. Cécile Vaissié, author of The Kremlin Networks, considers Jean-Luc Mélenchon as "one of those that approve of Putin", and Yannick Jadot of EELV said that the "pro-Russia" stance is "contrary to any environment thinking".

Mélenchon mocked accusations of support for Putin, saying that it is unlikely that an "eco-socialist" would support Putin, and when attacked by Benoît Hamon on the topic of Putin, he stated: "I am not bound in any way to Mr. Putin. I am absolutely fighting his policy, and if I were Russian, I would not vote for his party, but for the Russian Left Front whose leader is in prison." However, Mélenchon believes Putin was legitimately elected and thus deserves appropriate respect for his position. Mélenchon declared opposition to Putin's domestic policy and notes his friend of the Russian Left Front, Sergey Udaltsov, is imprisoned in Russia.

In February 2022, Mélenchon condemned Putin's invasion of Ukraine.

Syria
Mélenchon is in favour of a United Nations-led intervention in Syria featuring all nations on the Security Council. He opposes intervention without international cooperation. After the chemical attack in Ghouta, he said that he feels like a strike on Syria "would be a mistake", and calls for a "political solution".

He has compared an intervention in Syria to Iraq, and has approved of Russia's intervention in Syria, saying that he believes Vladimir Putin will resolve the ISIS problem in Syria, noting "It was the Russians who cut off the lines of supply that Daesh used to smuggle oil to Turkey". He said many times that he believed Putin could not be left to solve the problem in Syria alone, saying: "The UN will solve the problem [...] it's time for an international coalition".

In response to the 2019 Turkish offensive into north-eastern Syria against the Kurdish-led SDF, Jean-Luc Melenchon tweeted:

Saudi Arabia
During a Europarliament session on 8 June 2016 concerning Venezuela, Mélenchon criticized what he called European hypocrisy, comparing European tolerance of Saudi Arabian rule and intolerance of Venezuelan rule.

Venezuela

In 2018, he described the countries that denounced the 2018 presidential election were "puppets of the United States". He said that the date of the election was agreed upon with the approval of former Spanish Prime Minister José Rodríguez Zapatero and that some of the opposition had decided to boycott it.

Iran

Following the killing of major general Qasem Soleimani, Mélenchon tweeted: "We must equally condemn the USA and Iran as warmongers. My condemnation of the USA does not exempt Iran from the fact that it is a theocracy that wants to destroy the State of Israel." On French news channel LCI, he declared: "the current government of Iran claims it wants to destroy the State of Israel. This is an intolerable project which in itself creates incredible tension in the region, and obviously favors extremes on either side."

Defence
Mélenchon wants France to withdraw from NATO (North Atlantic Treaty Organization), and advocates for what he calls a "separate France" which is pacifist. He opposes the concept of a unified European army.

Regionalism
Mélenchon has no real position on regionalism, but has stated that he supports the teaching of regional languages, especially Breton. He supports state funding for the teaching of the Breton language. He has gone against autonomy for Brittany, even criticising socialists from the region for promoting "autonomy".

In 2018, Mélenchon was asked a question about an anti-corruption investigation by a journalist from Toulouse. He responded by mocking her accent, accusing her of "talking nonsense" and then asking "has anyone got a question in more or less comprehensible French?". Video of the exchange was circulated widely on social media and sparked a debate about whether discrimination based on regional accents should be made illegal. Mélenchon apologised for his comment, claiming he thought the journalist was mocking him.

Controversies

Interactions with the media
Jean-Luc Mélenchon is often highly critical of the media, and has asked his supporters to monitor and film journalists, especially of Le Monde and Libération. Mélenchon has insulted numerous journalists. He labelled Renaud Revel of L'Express a "dirty little spy" and called the magazine "fascist". In 2021 he was found guilty of public defamation after calling a Le Monde journalist a reformed assassin and a CIA muse on his blog in November 2016. He frequently criticizes Germany and German policy, leading to spats with German newsmagazine Der Spiegel, which has run articles calling him a "demagogue" and "a hater of Germany."

Accusations of anti-Semitism
In 2013, Mélenchon referred to French Finance Minister Pierre Moscovici as "one of those 17 Eurogroup bastards [finance ministers]” putting pressure on Cyprus as it urgently sought a bail-out solution to its debt crisis. "Moscovici behaves like someone who has stopped thinking in French, like someone who thinks only in the language of international finance". He was accused of making "unacceptable comments". Harlem Désir stated that "Mélenchon should immediately withdraw these unacceptable comments that he made using the vocabulary of the 1930s". Mélenchon responded that he "had no idea of Pierre Moscovici’s religion and [had] no intention of making an issue of it in the future".

In August 2014, during a speech in Grenoble, Mélenchon criticised the Representative Council of Jews of France (CRIF), a coalition of organisations representing French Jewry, saying "We’ve had enough of CRIF. France is the opposite of aggressive communities that lecture to the rest of country." He also stated "We do not believe that any people is superior to another", which was viewed by his critics as an allusion to the Torah's designation of Jews as the "chosen people". Mélenchon's comments came in the wake of a series of protests in France against Israel's 2014 Gaza War. Pro-Palestinian demonstrators marched in French cities. Anti-Semitic attacks had been reported in France within the previous month. The Jewish Telegraphic Agency wrote that Mélenchon did not refer to the attacks but criticised French Jews for "rally[ing] in front of the embassy of a foreign country or serv[ing] its flag, weapon in hand."

In July 2017, Mélenchon maintained that Republican France bears no guilt in the Holocaust, and criticized Emmanuel Macron for admitting at a gathering in Paris remembering the Vel' d'Hiv Roundup that Vichy France was the legal French government at the time, thus conceding the French State's responsibility in the deportation of the Jews. Mélenchon's comments were echoing those of François Mitterrand a former president, who declared in 1994 that the round-up and deportation of Jews to death camps during the war was the work of the country's Nazi occupiers and "Vichy France", an illegitimate entity distinct from France. Haaretz noted that Marine Le Pen had made comments similar to Mélenchon's three months earlier.

Following the murder in March 2018 in Paris of Mireille Knoll, an elderly Jewish woman who survived the events at Vel d'Hiv and the Holocaust, CRIF leadership requested Mélenchon stay away from a march in her memory; Mireille's son, Daniel, said that "everyone without exception" could attend, and that, "CRIF is being political, I’m opening my heart to all those who have a mother". As with Marine Le Pen, who made the same choice to be present, despite the appeal, he was booed and abused by a group of extremist protesters. In November 2019, Mélenchon further accused CRIF of practising "blatant, violent, and aggressive sectarianism, namely against me", after it asked him not to attend the memorial ceremony for Knoll more than 18 months earlier. No physical violence occurred at the march; police accompanied Mélenchon and his team away from the proceedings.

In December 2019, he deplored that UK Labour Party leader Jeremy Corbyn gave in to the accusations of anti-Semitism in his party, saying Corbyn "had to endure, unaided, churlish anti-Semitism claims from England's chief rabbi and various influence networks linked to Likud. Instead of riposting, he spent his time apologising and making pledges ... It showed a weakness that troubled the popular sectors [of the electorate]". Mélenchon later published a post on his personal blog denouncing the use of anti-Semitism as a pretext to launch smear campaigns against political figures. He called the "method ... absurd, offending, but, more importantly, dangerous. For all this is at the expense of the real fight against anti-Semitism. Its main result is to lower the vigilance threshold of sincere anti-racists".

In 2020, while interviewed about the French police, he said, "I don't know if Jesus was on a cross, but he was apparently put there by his own people". This declaration was condemned by the Wiesenthal Center, who said that it was spreading belief in Jewish deicide; they noted that this allegation was condemned by the papal encyclical Nostra Aetate, and noted that "its imagery fuelled violence across Europe, culminating in the Nazi Holocaust". In October 2021, Mélenchon was again accused of anti-Semitism, after he made a comment singling out the Jewish tradition as responsible for the far-right political positions of Éric Zemmour. His remark was condemned as anti-Semitic by political figures on the political spectrum, such as Christophe Castaner (LREM), Gilbert Collard (RN), and Pierre Moscovici (PS).

Accusations of promoting conspiracy theories
In 2011, Rudy Reichstadt, director of Conspiracy Watch, commented that while it would be "quite unfair" to call Mélenchon a conspiracy theorist, he did sometimes abet anti-semitic conspiracy theories by downplaying them or making excuses for those who promulgate them.

In June 2021, Mélenchon predicted that, in the last week of the 2022 presidential campaign, there would be a "grave incident or murder" that would be used to "point the finger at the Muslims and to invent a civil war". He cited the attack on retiree Paul Voise in 2002 shortly before the 1st round of the presidential election, the Jihadist attack against a Jewish school in Toulouse by Mohammed Merah a few months before the presidential election of 2012, and the terrorist attack in Paris a few days before the first round of the 2017 presidential election. His statements were supported by his own party and condemned by other political parties.  He later clarified that he was referring to "murderers [who] are waiting for the best time to get people talking about them" and the politicians who use these events for electoral purposes. Rudy Reichstadt, director of Conspiracy Watch, described Mélenchon's statement as "ambiguous" and quite close to conspiracy beliefs. He claimed that Mélenchon has been promoting conspiracy theories for several years.

Political career 
Governmental functions

Minister of Vocational Education, 2000–2002.

Electoral mandates

National Assembly of France

Member for Bouches-du-Rhône's 4th constituency, 2017–2022

European Parliament

Member of European Parliament, 2009–2017.

Senate of France

Senator of Essonne, 1986–2000 (became minister in 2000), 2004–2010 (resignation, elected in European Parliament in 2009). Elected in 1986, re-elected in 1995, 2004. (At the age of 35, he was the youngest member of the Senate when he was elected to it in 1986.)

General Council

Vice-president of the General Council of Essonne, 1998–2001.

General councillor of Essonne, 1985–1992, 1998–2004. Re-elected in 1998.

Municipal Council

Deputy-mayor of Massy, Essonne, 1983–1995.

Municipal councillor of Massy, Essonne, 1983–2001. Re-elected in 1989, 1995.

Political function

Co-president of the Left Party, 2008–2014.

Publications 
Mélenchon's published works include:

References

External links 
 
 
 Page on the French Senate website
 MEP webpage
 

 
1951 births
Anti-German sentiment in Europe
Candidates in the 2012 French presidential election
Candidates in the 2017 French presidential election
Candidates in the 2022 French presidential election
Deputies of the 15th National Assembly of the French Fifth Republic
Ecosocialists
French Senators of the Fifth Republic
French people of Italian descent
French people of Sicilian descent
French people of Spanish descent
Government ministers of France
Internationalist Communist Organisation politicians
La France Insoumise politicians
Left Party (France) MEPs
Left Party (France) politicians
Left-wing populism in France
Living people
Lycée Pierre-Corneille alumni
MEPs for South-West France 2009–2014
MEPs for South-West France 2014–2019
People from Tangier
Socialist Party (France) politicians
Senators of Essonne
University of Franche-Comté alumni
French politicians convicted of crimes
Members of Parliament for Bouches-du-Rhône
French atheists